KXBS (95.5 FM) is a non-commercial, listener-supported radio station licensed to Bethalto, Illinois, and serving Greater St. Louis.  It is owned by Gateway Creative Broadcasting and broadcasts a Christian Rhythmic Contemporary radio format known as "Boost 95.5."  The radio studios for KXBS and sister station KLJY are in Des Peres.

KXBS has an effective radiated power (ERP) of 10,500 watts.  The transmitter is on DeBaliviere Avenue in St. Louis, just north of Forest Park.

History

WXJO
The station signed on in 1987 as WXJO.  It was originally an Adult Standards outlet broadcasting with 6,000 watts. In 1989, Bob Cox negotiated a package to take over operation of the station, changing the format to children's radio.  It was called The Imagination Station, Radio Just For Kids.  Inadequate advertisement revenues combined with a pending lawsuit from the original trademark holder of the name The Imagination Station forced Cox into a position where he could not maintain the lease on the transmitter.

In the summer of 1991, the station moniker was changed to Fun Radio.  Thinking the transmitter could be sold, the lease was terminated in late 1991.  The station went dark for a couple of months, during which time the potential sale fell through.  The owner, looking for revenues that would allow him to keep the transmitter out of foreclosure, worked with a former employee of the Imagination Station.

WFUN-FM
In 1992, it was brought back on the air, with the call sign WFUN-FM. The station was once owned by a non-profit group who would later refund the contributors after a decision was made to make the station a commercial outlet by signing up with Radio Aahs, a children's radio network (and the predecessor to Radio Disney, who would later run Radio Aahs out of business). After a several year run, using the station moniker “Planet Fun”, the owner (who was mostly mocked by many in the St. Louis radio market for being unseen and a mystery) decided to sell the station to Radio One in 1999. The station went dark again for several months.

On June 2, 2000, WFUN completed an upgrade to 24,500 watts and officially flipped to R&B/Hip-Hop music as Q95-5, although it never changed the call letters to match the Q handle. At first, Q95-5 was a close competitor, but over time fell further and further behind to KATZ-FM in the ratings.  It also had other problems in attracting African-American listeners, mostly due to its signal coverage.

Urban AC
On December 13, 2004, Radio One flipped WFUN to urban adult contemporary, branded as "Foxy 95.5". The move was made after Radio One purchased the syndicated rights to the Tom Joyner Morning Show. The format switch was made to match that of stations that air Tom Joyner's show. Tom Joyner previously aired on rival KMJM-FM in the St. Louis market. Eventually, WFUN added the Love, Lust and Lies with Michael Baisden afternoon show as well.

On October 1, 2005, Radio One added a sister station, WHHL (Hot 104.1), which started out as Rhythmic, but is now Urban.

Urban oldies
On November 7, 2012, at 7 p.m., WFUN flipped to urban oldies, branded as "Old School 95.5". The final song on "Foxy" was "It's So Hard to Say Goodbye to Yesterday" by Boyz II Men, while the first song on "Old School" was "Fantastic Voyage" by Lakeside. The switch mirrors similar flips in Dallas, Charlotte, Philadelphia, and Cincinnati.

Shortly after longtime rival KMJM-FM flipped to classic hip-hop in November 2014, WFUN dropped the "Old School" moniker and starting calling itself "95.5".  It added more current music, and adopted the slogan "Old School & Today's R&B." By early 2015, the "Old School" branding had returned.

On November 17, 2016, WFUN rebranded again as "95.5: R&B and Old School for the Lou", and shifted back to Urban AC.

Boost 95.5
On November 5, 2020, Urban One announced that it would trade WHHL and the intellectual property of WFUN-FM, as well as two other stations in Philadelphia and Washington, D.C., to Entercom.  In exchange, Urban One would get WBT/WBT-FM, WFNZ and WLNK in Charlotte, North Carolina. The following day, Urban One announced it would divest WFUN-FM to Gateway Creative Broadcasting, owner of Contemporary Christian-formatted KLJY. The group will take over WFUN-FM under a local marketing agreement (LMA) on January 4, 2021, and flip the station to Christian rhythmic CHR as Boost Radio (in simulcast with KQBS).

The urban AC format and the "Lou" branding would be moved to Entercom's KNOU as 96.3 The Lou at midnight on November 23.  The next day, WFUN-FM changed call letters to KXBS to match the "Boost Radio" branding. The WFUN-FM call sign concurrently moved to 96.3.

From November 23, 2020 through December 15, 2020, KXBS ran a four-minute loop produced by Urban One, directing listeners to 96.3 to hear WFUN. On December 16, 2020, Gateway Creative Broadcasting's LMA began, and KXBS began stunting with a rhythmic adult contemporary micro-format as "95.5 JAMS", which lasted until 9:55 a.m. on January 4, 2021, when "Boost" officially moved to 95.5. The sale to Gateway was officially approved by the FCC on March 5, 2021, and was consummated on April 20.

HD2 sub-channel
As of January 1, 2022, KXBS-HD2 broadcasts a rhythmic adult contemporary format branded as "95.5 Jams, The Rhythm of St. Louis".

References

External links

Urban One stations
Christian radio stations in Illinois
Rhythmic contemporary radio stations in the United States